The Catholic Church in Sudan is part of the worldwide Catholic Church, under the spiritual leadership of the Pope in Rome.

There are approximately 1.1 million Catholics in Sudan, about 3.2% of the total population. Sudan forms one ecclesiastical province, consisting of one archdiocese and one suffragan diocese.

See also
List of saints from Africa
Archdiocese of Khartoum
El Obeid

References

Sources
GCatholic.org
Christian Churches in Sudan

 
Sudan
Sudan